Hypagyrtis piniata, the pine measuringworm, is a species of geometrid moth in the family Geometridae. It is found in North America.

The MONA or Hodges number for Hypagyrtis piniata is 6656.

References

Further reading

 

Boarmiini
Articles created by Qbugbot
Moths described in 1870